Lot 55 is a township in Kings County, Prince Edward Island, Canada.  It is part of St. George's Parish. Lot 55 was awarded to Hugh Finlay and Francis and Samuel McKay in the 1767 land lottery.

References

55
Geography of Kings County, Prince Edward Island